Alto Tâmega Dam is a concrete double curvature arch dam on the Tâmega River. It is located in the municipalities of Ribeira de Pena and Vila Pouca de Aguiar, in Vila Real District, Portugal.

It is part of the wider Tâmega Electricity-Generating Group formed of 3 dams and 3 plants

Iberdrola signed a 70-year concession with the Government of Portugal in July 2014 for the design, construction and operation of three projects: Alto Tâmega, Daivões and Gouvães dams.

Construction of the dam will be completed in 2024.

Dam
Alto Tâmega Dam is a 106.5 m tall and 334 long double-curvature concrete.

Reservoir
The reservoir surface area for the dam has 7.4 km2.

Power plant 
The generating unit of the dam consists of two 80MW turbine units with a maximum flow rate of 200m³/s producing 139GWh of electricity a year. The dam contains two lateral spillways with combined discharge capacity of 1,825m³/s, which protect the dam from over-topping.

See also

 List of power stations in Portugal
 List of dams and reservoirs in Portugal

References

Dams in Portugal
Hydroelectric power stations in Portugal
Dams completed in 2022
Energy infrastructure completed in 2022
2022 establishments in Portugal